The Dark Room is a 1982 Australian thriller film directed by Paul Harmon, son of Bill Harmon.

Plot
Ray Sangster, a bored middle-class man, has an affair with a younger woman, Nicky. Ray's son Mike discovers the affair and becomes obsessed with Nicky.

Cast
Alan Cassell as Ray Sangster
Anna Maria Monticelli (Anna Jemison) as Nicky
Svet Kovich as Mike Sangster
Diana Davidson as Martha Sangster
Ric Hutton as Sam Bitel
Rowena Wallace as Liz Llewellyn
Sean Myers as Peter
Sally Cooper as Patricia

Production
Michael Brindley wrote a script based on a story by himself and Paul Harmon. Basil Appleby was originally meant to be producer but financiers Filmco did not want him to do the job and Malcolm Smith did it. Then Smith left and documentary producer Tom Haydon produced instead.

There was a two-week rehearsal period in which actors rewrote dialogue and treated Harmon badly. Three weeks into the seven-week shoot the completion guarantors saw the footage and suggested Harmon be fired but the producer refused. Film editor Ron Adamson died and had to be replaced by Don Saunders.

Release
The film failed to obtain a cinema release. The Dark Room was delegated to home video and was not seen on TV until 1989 as a Monday night movie at 8.30pm. It was again replayed during the early 1990s though has not been seen commercially since that time. This film is still awaiting a dvd or blu-ray release.

References

External links

Trailer at YouTube

Australian thriller films
1982 films
1980s English-language films
1980s Australian films